This article is about the particular significance of the year 1761 to Wales and its people.

Incumbents
Lord Lieutenant of Anglesey - Sir Nicholas Bayly, 2nd Baronet (from 25 November)
Lord Lieutenant of Caernarvonshire- Thomas Wynn (from 4 July)
Lord Lieutenant of Denbighshire - Richard Myddelton  
Lord Lieutenant of Flintshire - Sir Roger Mostyn, 5th Baronet (from 10 July)
Lord Lieutenant of Merionethshire - vacant
Montgomeryshire) – Henry Herbert, 1st Earl of Powis (from 4 July)
Lord Lieutenant of Glamorgan – Other Windsor, 4th Earl of Plymouth
Lord Lieutenant of Brecknockshire and Lord Lieutenant of Monmouthshire – Thomas Morgan
Lord Lieutenant of Cardiganshire – Wilmot Vaughan, 3rd Viscount Lisburne
Lord Lieutenant of Carmarthenshire – George Rice
Lord Lieutenant of Pembrokeshire – Sir William Owen, 4th Baronet
Lord Lieutenant of Radnorshire – Howell Gwynne

Bishop of Bangor – John Egerton
Bishop of Llandaff – Richard Newcome (until 9 July); John Ewer (from 28 December)
Bishop of St Asaph – Robert Hay Drummond (until June) Richard Newcome (from 9 July)
Bishop of St Davids – Anthony Ellys (until 16 January) Samuel Squire (from 24 March)

Events
Edward Allgood II (1712–1801) establishes a japannery at Usk.
Goronwy Owen takes up his position as a rector in Virginia, and his salary is agreed.

Arts and literature

New books
Thomas Pennant - British Zoology, volume 1
John Wesley - Rules of the United Societies, translated into Welsh by John Evans of Bala.

Music
John Parry - A Collection of Welsh, English and Scotch Airs

Births

16 February - Priscilla Bertie, 21st Baroness Willoughby de Eresby, Welsh-descended noblewoman and Baroness Gwydyr (died 1828)
15 July - Walter Davies (Gwallter Mechain), writer (died 1849)
11 October - David Charles, hymn-writer (died 1834)
date unknown 
Charles Heath, Radical printer and writer, twice Mayor of Monmouth, in Worcestershire (died 1831)
Elizabeth Whitlock, sister of Sarah Siddons and Julia Ann Hatton
Helen Maria Williams, novelist and poet, in Scotland (died 1827)

Deaths
16 January - Anthony Ellys, Bishop of St Davids, 70
4 February - Samuel Davies, Welsh-descended evangelist in America, 37 (pneumonia)
8 April - Griffith Jones Llanddowror, pioneer in education, 77
27 April - Sir William Williams, 2nd Baronet, of Clapton, Welsh-descended politician, ?31

References

1761 by country
1761 in Great Britain